Leven Kali, is a Dutch singer, songwriter, producer, and multi-instrumentalist, best known for his work on Beyoncé's Renaissance.

Discography
Studio albums
 Low Tide (2019)
 HIGHTIDE (2020)

Songwriting and production credits
Credits are courtesy of Discogs, Tidal, Apple Music, and AllMusic.

Guest appearances

Awards and nominations

References 

Living people
Dutch singer-songwriters
Dutch male singer-songwriters
Funk musicians
1996 births